Faller is a Germanic surname that may refer to
Faller, a German toy company founded by brothers Edwin and Hermann Faller
"Faller" (song), by Krista Siegfrids, 2016
Chris Faller (born 1985), American bass guitar player
Fred Faller (1895–1984), American long-distance runner
James E. Faller, American physicist 
Jason Faller, Canadian video game developer, cofounder of Camera 40 Productions
Kevin Faller (1920–1983), Irish scriptwriter and poet
Marion Faller (1941–2014), American photographer
Newton Faller (1947–1996), Brazilian computer scientist and electrical engineer
Otto Faller (1889–1971), German Jesuit priest and educator
Ruwen Faller (born 1980), German sprinter